Mala Conducta (English: Bad Conduct) is the name of the second telenovela of Chilevisión. It was released in March 2008. The piece is made by the guionist Coca Gómez, produced by Javier Larenas and directed by Ricardo Vicuña.
The basis of the telenovela is a school with low rendiment scholars and adults finalizing their studies in the 2x1 system.

The publicity starts the January 16, with the song "Incomprendido", composed by Juan Andrés Ossandón.

Cast

 Willy Semler - Pelayo Bobadilla
 Magdalena Max-Neef - Amelia Rodríguez
 María José Prieto - Flavia Inostroza
 Ignacia Allamand - Martina Bobadilla
 Tiago Correa - Felix Inostroza
 Rodrigo Bastidas - Patricio Cabezón
 Ana María Gazmuri - Georgette Ventura
 Marcela del Valle - Nicole Gallardo
 Jenny Cavallo - Carola Gallardo
 Alvaro Gómez - Rigoberto Bobadilla
 José Palma - Damián Bobadilla
 Juan Pablo Ogalde - Carlos Pelayo Bobadilla
 Javiera Hernández - Donatella Naranjo
 Andrés Arriola - Kurt Curiche
 Alex Walters - Mario Ricapito
 Malucha Pinto - Ninfa Acevedo
 María José Bello - Dominga Magallanes
 Emilio Edwards - Ignacio Magallanes/Iñaki Elometa
 Erto Pantoja - José María Magallanes
 Francisca Opazo - Valeska
 Ariel Levy - Pablo Parra (El Carpa)
 Pablo Macaya - Vladimir Cataldo
 Natalia Grez - María Chicharro
 Mauricio Diocares - Rolo Mendoza
 Francisco Pizarro - Diego Gutiérrez (El Rayo)
 Gonzalo Robles - Padre Plinio Bobadilla
 Tatiana Molina - Sabrina Sepúlveda
 Andrés Pozo - Marlon

Trivia

 Dos Por Uno was the working title of the telenovela.

See also

 Don Amor - Canal 13
 Viuda Alegre - TVN

References

2008 telenovelas
2008 Chilean television series debuts
2008 Chilean television series endings
Chilean telenovelas
Chilevisión telenovelas
Spanish-language telenovelas